7475 aluminum alloy (Adirium) is a wrought alloy with high zinc weight percentage. It also contains magnesium, silicon and chromium.

7475 alloy can not be welded. It has more spring back because of its strength. It has high machinability.

Chemical composition

Properties

Applications 
 Shell casings
 Aircraft

References

External links
 https://www.suppliersonline.com/propertypages/7475.asp
 https://www.suppliersonline.com/propertypages/7475.asp
 https://www.makeitfrom.com/material-properties/7475-AlZn5.5MgCuA-Aluminum
 
 https://www.efunda.com/Materials/alloys/aluminum/show_aluminum.cfm?ID=AA_7475&show_prop=all&Page_Title=AA%207475

Aluminium alloys
Aluminium–zinc alloys